The Party AUDIO STACK (The Party) is the 20th album by Japanese jazz fusion band Casiopea. In addition, the video was released simultaneously as The Party VISUAL STACK on June 25, 1990 with LaserDisc and VHS. Also, when we sent the application tickets attached to "AUDIO STACK" and "VISUAL STACK", we got The Party EXTRA STACK (VHS LPR-017) by lottery.
This album marked the joining of Yoshihiro Naruse (bass) and Masaaki Hiyama (drums) to the band. This is also Casiopea's 20th overall album.

Track listing of AUDIO STACK (CD PICL-1006)

Personnel
CASIOPEA are
Issei Noro - Electric guitar, Acoustic guitar
Minoru Mukaiya - Keyboards
Yoshihiro Naruse - Electric Bass
Masaaki Hiyama - Drums

Production
Sound Produced - Casiopea
Project Produced - Taketsune Kubo
Recording & Mixing Engineers - Koji Sugimori
Assistant Engineers - Masashi Kudo, Yuji Kuraishi
Synclavier Operator - Kenji Takizawa
Mastering Engineers - Mitsuharu Kobayashi
Art Director - Mitsuaki Takeda
Cover Design - Mayumi Fujimori
Photograph - Toshtaka Niwa

Release history of AUDIO STACK

References
 『BAND SCORE CASIOPEA THE PARTY』August 20, 1990 Rittor Music, Inc.

External links

The Party VISUAL STACK 

The Party VISUAL STACK (The Party) is the video work by Japanese jazz fusion band Casiopea on June 25, 1990 with LaserDisc and VHS. At the same time, 
album The Party AUDIO STACK was also released. Also, when we sent the application tickets attached to "AUDIO STACK" and "VISUAL STACK", we got The Party EXTRA STACK (VHS LPR-017) by lottery.
This album marked the joining of Yoshihiro Naruse (bass) and Masaaki Hiyama (drums) to the band.

Track listing of VISUAL STACK (DVD GNBL-1006)

(*) 15 is bonus truck of DVD GNBL-1006.

Track listing of EXTRA STACK (VHS LPR-017)

Personnel
CASIOPEA are
Issei Noro - Electric guitar, Acoustic guitar
Minoru Mukaiya - Keyboards
Yoshihiro Naruse - Electric Bass
Masaaki Hiyama - Drums

DANCERS
Tomomi Imai
Yoshiko Uno
Kumiko Sawada
Yukari Nakamoto
Chieko Noguchi
Andy Blankenbuehler
Izumi Aochi
Shigeo Kathy
Nobuaki Hagino
Kazushi Yabe

Production
 Director - Hideki Tsushima (PIPCO)
 Dance Director - Rocky
 Assistant Director - Masatoshi Sato, Ryuji Sugiyama
 Director of Photography - Joji Ide
 Cameraman - Shigeru Mikoshiba, Hiro Ito, Shinichi Chiba, Takashi Suga, Toshihiro Ota
 Camera Assistant - Kazuya Yamagata, keiji Hashimoto, Yumiko Yamagata, Takuko Nishiyama, Akinori Shigeeda, Tatsuo Tanaka, Kenji Shibata, Toru Suzuki, Naoki Tokugawa
 Choreographer - Koji Otsuka, Kamori Kanaya
 Choreograph Assistant - Naomi Shibata, Yumiko Tsukuda
 Lighting Director - Hiroyuki Matsumoto
 Lighting Designer - Mitsutaka Gotoh
 Syncrolite Operator - Yoshikazu Yamada
 Sub Operator - Taro Kondo
 Syncrolite Engineer - Hideyuki Asada
 Lighting Assistant - Akira Hasegawa, Masayuki Eto, Kimiko Asada, Masahiro Kobayashi, Takashi Ya,ashita, Hirokazu Uchida, Kanae Nonaka, Hiroshi Inumaki, Chie Okawa, Mina Ishigaki, Masakazu Sasaki
 Production Designer - Yoshitoshi Egashira
 Art Director - Tadahiko Komiyama
 Special Effect - Toshiyuki Hatanaka
 Assistant Engineer - Masashi Kudo, Yuji Kuraishi, Tetsuo Saito, Takeshi Higuchi, Takeshi Sasaki, Shanty Kobayashi, Hiroto Tsuruta, Shigeru Takagi, Kazumi Ichinose
 P.A. Engineer - Tsutomu Ueda
 Assistant Engineer - Jiro Arita
 Synclavier Engineer - Kenji Takizawa, David Fromm, Steven Fromm, Ikuo Honma
 Rail & Crane System - Tatsumi Kuramochi, Susumu Nanba, Yujiro Takeda, Tsutomu Abe, Shinji Arima, Norio Ninomiya, Mikio Sakai, Futoshi Yokobori, Seiji Takaku, Toshiya Tsurumi, Kenshiro Fujiwara, Takatori Mukai
 Hair & Make Up - Hisako Oguri
 FV Engineer - Yoshiki Nishina
 Editor - N・A・O
 M.A. Mixer - Takumi Murayama
 Sound Effect - Nori Miyata
 Art Designer - Mitsuaki Takeda
 Cover Designer - Mayumi Fujimori
 Assistant Producer - Tadashi Nomura
 Chief Manager - Kazuaki Negishi
 Manager - Takeshi Inoue
 Technicians - Shigeo Matsuyama, Yasushi Horiuchi, Yoshitsugu Nozawa
 Co-Producer - Shunsuke Goto (TAMCO)
 Producer - Takatsune Kudo (PIONEER LDC)

Release history of VISUAL STACK

External links
 LasorDisc Database Cassiopeia: The Party VISUAL STACK

References

1990 live albums
Casiopea live albums
Casiopea video albums
1990 video albums
Live video albums